The Ohio Poetry Association (OPA) is a non-profit state-level poetry association in the U.S. state of Ohio, which is affiliated with the National Federation of State Poetry Societies (NFSPS). The organization promotes poetry, conducts monthly and annual contests, publishes poetry books and organizes periodic meetings, workshops and festivals.

History

The Ohio Poetry Association was first organized on Columbus, Ohio, in 1929 as the Verse Writers' Guild or Ohio. The OPA incorporated as a nonprofit 501(c)(3) educational organization in Mansfield, Ohio, in 1978 and affiliated with the National Federation of State Poetry Societies.

Activities

The Ohio Poetry Association offers member benefits including quarterly poetry workshops, annual programs, readings, students contests and various special events. The society publishes a quarterly newsletter titled Workshopping Our Words and a members-only poetry journal called Common Threads.

References

External links

Poetry organizations
Literary societies
1929 establishments in Ohio
Non-profit organizations based in Ohio
501(c)(3) organizations
Arts organizations established in 1929